We Are the Same is the eleventh studio album by Canadian rock band The Tragically Hip, released April 7, 2009 on Universal Music Canada, and by Zoë Records in the United States. The album was recorded at The Bathouse Recording Studio in Bath, Ontario with producer Bob Rock.

The opening track, "Morning Moon", was released on the band's website in advance of the album's release. The first single, "Love Is a First", was released February 27, 2009 and peaked at #22 on the Canadian Hot 100.

On April 6, 2009, to coincide with the release of We Are the Same, The Tragically Hip performed at The Bathouse Recording Studio in a concert that was screened live in Cineplex theatres across Canada.

Commercial performance
The album sold just under 27,000 copies in its first week and debuted at #1 on the Canadian Albums Chart, making it the band's eighth #1 on the chart. In the U.S. it peaked at #148 on the Billboard 200. The album reached platinum certification in Canada the year it was released.

Track listing

Charts

Weekly charts

Year-end charts

References

2009 albums
The Tragically Hip albums
Albums produced by Bob Rock
Universal Music Canada albums